Charles William Edward Leigh (Charles W. E. Leigh, born 1871) was an English academic librarian. From 1895 to 1903 he was successively on the staff of the British Museum (Natural History) and librarian of the Manchester Literary and Philosophical Society. In 1903 he was appointed librarian of the Library of Manchester University and held the post until his retirement in 1935. He edited two important catalogues of collections in the Library and established new administrative methods to replace the cumbersome systems used in the 19th century. The Dewey Decimal Classification was introduced by him together with higher standards in cataloguing based on those of the British Museum library.

Publications 
 1915: Catalogue of the Christie Collection. Manchester: University Press
 1929: "The Christie Library" in: The Book of Manchester and Salford; for the British Medical Association. Manchester: George Falkner & Sons, 1929; pp. 73–75 
 1932: Catalogue of the Library for Deaf Education. Manchester: University Press

 

English librarians
1871 births
Year of death missing
20th-century deaths